John Stuart (25 September 1718 – 21 March 1779) was a Scottish-born official of the British Empire in the colony of South Carolina, North America. He was the superintendent for the southern district of the British Indian Department from 1761 to 1779; his northern counterpart was Sir William Johnson, based in the colony of New York.

Early life
Born in Inverness, Scotland, in 1718, by 1748 Stuart had emigrated to the British colony of South Carolina. There he worked as a merchant and became prominent in local affairs. In 1760 he served as a militia captain in the Anglo-Cherokee War (1759–1761). Stuart was captured by the Cherokee, but he was ransomed by Chief Attakullakulla and returned to South Carolina.

Appointment as Superintendent in the Indian Department
Captain Stuart's familiarity with Native Americans and the frontier earned his appointment in 1761 as royal superintendent in the Indian Department. His role was to help Great Britain and the colonies bring order to their relations with the Southeast Indians (who became known as the "Five Civilized Tribes"). He also worked to prevent the organization of anti-British native confederations, such as the one that organized Pontiac's Rebellion in 1763. 

In 1762 Stuart appointed Alexander Cameron as his deputy. Cameron had served at Fort Prince George during the Anglo-Cherokee War, and had long experience with and empathy for the Cherokee. They called him "Scotchie" and considered him one of the few white men they trusted. He helped build relations with the Southeast Indians and bring peace to the backcountry in the years before the American Revolutionary War.

American Revolutionary War
When the war broke out in 1775, most Native American leaders in Stuart and Cameron's area supported the British. In the summer of 1776, the Cherokee opened a series of concerted attacks against frontier settlements from Tennessee to central South Carolina, hoping to expel the colonists. Initially Stuart and Cameron tried to prevent the violence, but once the attacks began, they tried to prevent the Cherokee from attacking loyalists.

Revolutionaries in both Carolinas and Virginia petitioned the Continental Congress to raise a militia to "exterpate"  the Cherokee. Eventually 6,000 militia troops were recruited from the three colonies under the overall command of Griffith Rutherford of North Carolina. While called the Rutherford Expedition, most of the Cherokee Towns were destroyed by forces commanded by Major Andrew Williamson of South Carolina.

Cameron and Cherokee allies led a successful ambush of Patriot militia led by Major Williamson at the Battle of Twelve Mile Creek on 1 August 1776 in western South Carolina. Williamson gathered reinforcements, however, and led several expeditions against the Cherokee, killing an estimated 2,000, and destroying half of their 62 towns.

During the war, Stuart fled to Georgia and then to Pensacola in the Loyalist colony of West Florida. He died there in 1779.

Legacy and honors
Stuart's home, built in 1772 in Charleston, is now known as the Colonel John Stuart House and was named a U.S. National Historic Landmark in 1973.

See also 

Anglo-Cherokee War (1759–1761)
Cherokee-American wars (1776–1794)

References

Bibliography

Further reading

External links
 
 
 

1718 births
1779 deaths
British Indian Department
British officials in the American Revolution
Colonial American Indian agents
Loyalists in the American Revolution from South Carolina
People of South Carolina in the French and Indian War
People from Charleston, South Carolina
People from Inverness
Scottish emigrants to the Thirteen Colonies
South Carolina colonial people